Eberhard Schrader (7 January 1836 – 4 July 1908) was a German orientalist primarily known for his achievements in Assyriology.

Biography
He was born at Braunschweig, and educated at Göttingen under Ewald.  In 1858 he won a university prize for a treatise on the Ethiopian languages, and in 1863 became professor of theology at the University of Zürich. Subsequently, he occupied chairs at Giessen (1870) and Jena (1873), and finally became professor of Oriental languages at the Friedrich Wilhelm University, Berlin in 1878. Though he turned first to biblical research, his chief achievements were in the field of Assyriology, in which he was a pioneer in Germany and acquired an international reputation. He died in Berlin.

Works
His publications include:

Studien zur Kritik und Erklärung der biblischen Urgeschichte (1863).
Wilhelm Martin Leberecht de Wette's Einleitung in das Alte Testament, 8th edition (1869).
Die assyrisch-babylonischen keilinschriften (1872).
Die keilinschriften und das Alte Testament (1872; 3rd edition by Heinrich Zimmern and Hugo Winckler, 1901–02).
Keilinschriften und Geschichtsforschung (1878). online
Die Höllenfahrt der Istar (text, trans., notes, 1874).
Die Namen der Meere in den assyrischen Inschriften, Berlin 1878 (online)
Zur Frage nach dem Ursprung der altbabylonischen Kultur (1884).
Keilinschriftliche Bibliothek, in conjunction with scholars Ludwig Abel, Carl Bezold, Peter Christian Albrecht Jensen, Felix Ernst Peiser and Hugo Winckler (1889).

Notes

References
 

1836 births
1908 deaths
German Christian theologians
19th-century German theologians
German Assyriologists
Writers from Braunschweig
People from the Duchy of Brunswick
German male non-fiction writers
19th-century male writers